McCagg is a surname. Notable people with the surname include:
 
David McCagg (born 1958), American swimmer
Elizabeth McCagg (born 1967), American rower
Mary McCagg (born 1967), American rower